Wind Wolves Preserve is a Wildlands Conservancy nature preserve consisting of  of land in Kern County, California, 35 miles southwest of Bakersfield. Located in the Transverse Ranges in Southern California, it stands in stark contrast to the agricultural Central Valley. Picnicking, hiking, mountain biking, and camping are common activities. There are several major archaeological sites. It is the largest non-profit nature preserve on the west coast.

Recreation
The preserve has hiking trails, small waterfall, several ponds, picnic area, Ramada, restrooms and campground. Outdoor education programs are offered for school children on ecology, wetland ecosystems, geology and Native American lifeways.

San Emigdio Canyon Sunset Theater provides family oriented movies in an outdoor setting.

The only part of the preserve that has been developed is San Emigdio Canyon. There are 28 miles of trails.  One trail connects to an adjacent National Forest trail. One route is a dirt road that can be used for hiking and biking. There are also trails that follow a riparian zone.

Two of the best Native American archaeological sites are at the preserve.  Pleito is one of the best painted rock-art sites in the world. Rock art of the Chumash people is among the most elaborate rock art. Cache Cave has a substantial collection of artifacts.  Neither site can be visited. Pleito is overly fragile.  Cache Cave has complex passages. Instead virtual reality is used to show the sites. VR headsets are available for people visiting the preserve during special events.

An international team researched the Cache Cave Native Californian site and produced several papers.

Geography
At the southern end of the Central Valley the land rises to the Transverse Ranges.  The preserve includes the San Emigdio Mountains and Pleito Hills.

The preserve helps connect the Coast Range and Sierra Nevada mountains. It's within the Transverse Ranges facilitating movement of animals improving genetic diversity.

The preserve is adjacent to the Los Padres National Forest.

Flora and Fauna
Wildlife includes Tule elk, deer, bear, mountain lions, bobcats, California condors, San Joaquin kit fox, and blunt-nosed leopard lizard.

An annual inventory of the tule elk is done each fall. 445 tule elk were counted in 2022.

This is one of the largest populations in the state. In 1998, 19 elk were moved onto the preserve. Natural growth has resulted in the current population. 

Wildflowers can be excellent in the spring if there was sufficient rain the prior winter.
Wildflowers can include poppies, lupine, hyacinth and phacelia.

An annual Spring Nature Festival has been held in March since 2014. There are exhibits, viewing of wildlife and wildflowers, and guided hikes.

Almost 8,000 people visit over a weekend.

Endangered species at the preserve include the San Joaquin kit fox, blunt-nosed leopard lizard, and Bakersfield cactus.

History
The Chumash tribe lived in this region until the 18th century.

In the 1820s, El Camino Viejo was a road that was part of the original road between San Francisco and Los Angeles.

In 1842, the property was a Mexican land grant.

From the 1850s to the 1990s it was a working cattle ranch.

In 1996, Wildlands Conservancy acquired the property and opened the preserve to the public for light recreation.

In 2011, lightning started a fire in the Pleito Hills sweeping through the Pleito Hills Bakerfield cactus. The Conservancy restored cactus at the burned site and established four new sites.

In 2021, the Wolf Fire burned 685 acres of grasslands. Firefighters fought the fire using ground and air resources.

In 2021, a conservation easement was placed on 14,631 acres of land within the preserve.  The California Rangeland Trust will monitor the easement.

3,500 cattle graze on this land.

References

Bibliography
 
 

Nature reserves in California
Protected areas of Kern County, California